Play it Again Des was an Irish sports chat show produced by RTÉ for two series.  The show was presented by Des Cahill and featured top sports personalities in discussion about their favourite sporting moments.

Format
The first series of Play it Again Des saw Des Cahill in conversation with three special sporting guests. Each of these special guests would highlight their own favourite sporting memory. A clip from archive footage would then be played. For the second series the number of special guests was reduced to two. The first show of the second series, however, saw Eamon Dunphy being interviewed by himself. The last episode of the second series featured no special guests. Instead the public were allowed to vote for their favourite sporting memory. The third and final series followed the same format of the Dunphy programme from the first show of the second series. Now, one special guest highlighted particular moments from their own careers.

Broadcasts

First series

Second series

Third series

References

2003 Irish television series debuts
2005 Irish television series endings
Irish sports television series
RTÉ original programming